Zisis Vrakas (Greek: Ζήσης Βράκας) was an important Greek chieftain of the Macedonian Struggle.

Biography 
Vrakas was born in 1857 in Perivoli of Grevena. He acted in the region of Pindus and Western Macedonia. Due to his persecution by the Ottoman authorities he was forced to flee to Larissa. Subsequently, as the leader of an armed group he participated in the 1896–1897 Greek Macedonian rebellion against several Ottoman targets. 

During the Macedonian Struggle, he acted with his group in the areas of Grevena, Voio and Kastanochoria against the Ottoman army detachments and Bulgarian armed groups, as well as against the pro-Romanian propaganda attempting to attract the Aromanian populations.

References 

 John S. Koliopoulos (editor), Αφανείς, γηγενείς Μακεδονομάχοι, Εταιρεία Μακεδονικών Σπουδών, University Studio Press, Thessaloniki, 2008, p. 21
 A. Anestopoulos, Ο Μακεδονικός Αγών 1903 – 1908, volume II, Thessaloniki 1969, p. 114
 Δημοτική Βιβλιοθήκη Κερατσινίου & Δραπετσώνας, Τρίτη 5 Απριλίου 2011, Σημαντικά γεγονότα... σαν σήμερα, 5 Απριλίου κηρύσσεται ο Ελληνοτουρκικός πόλεμος του 1897, Εισβολή ατάκτων

Greek people of the Macedonian Struggle
Greek Macedonians
Macedonian revolutionaries (Greek)
People from Grevena (regional unit)
Greek people from the Ottoman Empire